A mind machine (aka brain machine or light and sound machine) uses pulsing rhythmic sound, flashing light, or a combination of these to alter the frequency of the user's brainwaves. Mind machines can induce deep states of relaxation, concentration, and in some cases altered states of consciousness, which have been compared to those obtained from meditation and shamanic exploration. Photic mind machines work with flickering lights embedded in sunglasses or a lamp that sits above or facing the user's head. The user then "watches" with their eyes closed. 

The process applied by some of these machines is said to induce brainwave synchronisation or entrainment.

History
The influence of rhythmic sounds and drums to enter altered states of consciousness is used in different indigenous tribes (see Shamanic music), as well as optical stimulation produced by the flickering light of camp fires or pressing lightly on the eyeballs. This "stroboscopic photo-stimulation produces 'photic driving', the alpha type of brain electrical activity associated with an altered state in which people are susceptible to suggestion". ( p. 12).

The first scientific observations were made by William Charles Wells in the 1790s who described different effects of binocular vision. His results were later transferred to be applied in binaural beats.  Visual experiments with flickering lights were conducted in the 1940s by William Grey Walter who used stroboscopic light flashes to measure their effects on brain activity, assessed with EEG. He reported effect not just on visual areas but on the whole cortex.

During the '60s and '70s the interest in different methods to induce altered states without the use of drugs were rising. Some of the induced states by rhythmic light and sound combinations were even described as psychedelic-like, while these claims lack adequate measurements for their similarity. In this line, numerous nightclubs began using strobes to maximize the effects of the music for dancing.

The development of alpha EEG feedback (see neurofeedback) is an important starting point for biofeedback and its explicit use for entering altered states of consciousness. In these decades, Jack Schwarz built one of the first mind machines using rhythmic sounds and variable frequency lights in goggles to produce certain mental states.  Enterprises started to produce different types of mind machines and some scientists followed the line of research to explore if and how these devices elicit effects on brain processes.

In the late 1980s and early 1990s Farley initiated an investigation concerning medical claims made by some manufacturers and sellers. The FDA concluded that Light and Sound Machines were not medical devices and did not warrant regulation. Sellers and manufacturers were given guidelines for how they could advertise these devices, and were required to include a disclaimer and cautionary document with each machine.
Nowadays, mind machines are rediscovered by some teenage cultures  as so called “digital drugs”, a legal way to enter altered states of consciousness.

Application 
Mind machines include flashing light devices, which are similar to the Brion Gysin dreamachine in that both produce a flickering visual field. Unlike flashing light devices, the dreamachine can be used by several people at once, but has few, if any, technical features.

Technical setting 

Mind machines typically consist of a control unit, a pair of headphones and/or strobe light goggles. The unit controls the sessions and drives the LEDs in the goggles. Professionally, they are usually referred to as Auditory Visual Stimulation Devices (AVS devices). Also mind machines are offered that can connect to the Internet for updates download of new session material.

Application rate 
One session normally takes between 15 and 60 minutes. During a session the user should lie relaxed, and place the glasses on the eyes, which should remain closed during the whole session. Many machines have pre-programmed sessions which vary in parameters like light brightness, audio pitch or beat frequency but also give the opportunity for the user to create a custom session. Typically one session consists of a series of segments. Within one segment parameters change in a constant way.
Mind machines are often used together with biofeedback or neurofeedback equipment in order to adjust the frequency on the fly, while proof for their effectiveness is lacking.

Description of altered states

Perceptual changes 
Light & sound mind machines can have various effects on the user. Most users describe seeing a flashing light, others perceive swirling patterns that have been compared to psychedelic light shows or fractals. A few users report seeing detailed, virtual reality like scenes. But also tactile and emotional changes are reported  after a 6 Hz photic stimulation, as well as auditory hallucinations like binaural beats.

Changes in brain activity 
Sessions will typically aim to address the target frequencies which correspond to delta (1-3 hertz), theta (4–7 Hz), alpha (8–12 Hz) or beta brain waves (13–40 Hz). Those frequency bands can be adjusted by the user based on the desired effects.

For relaxation, often a reduction from beta waves to lower alpha or theta frequencies is observed. It is aimed to reach a level of “slow alpha” (8 Hz). Glickson (1986) states that an alpha frequency of 10 Hz is optimal for perceiving visual hallucinations. He assumes that it's the change in alpha activity and not the alpha activity itself that is facilitating an altered state of consciousness.

After effects 
Even if research is not sufficient so far, Michael Hutchison and other scientists report strong tranquilizing effects that lasted up to 3 days. After several sessions it is observed that users can produce a desired brain state with the associated brainwaves easier and deliberately.

Other information

Therapeutic use 
Clinical research has been done on the use of auditory and visual stimulation to improve cognitive abilities in learning-disabled children as well as in the treatment of autism and attention deficit hyperactivity disorder (ADHD). However, lacking enough evidence to conclude that these treatments show efficacy, several studies indicate the potential to  increase effects on IQ and reading levels in primary students, but also improvements in inattention and impulsiveness in children with ADHD (cite Siever).

Safety

Rapidly flashing lights may be dangerous for people with photosensitive epilepsy or other nervous disorders such as migraine.  It is thought that one out of 10,000 adults will experience a seizure while viewing such a device; about twice as many children will have a similar ill effect.

Regulation

Mind machine devices are legally available throughout the United States from many sources.

With some exceptions, these devices commonly do not have FDA approval for medical applications in the US. They have been found by a U.S. district court to be Class III medical devices, and consequentially require FDA pre-market approval for all medical uses. One company making medical claims for a possibly unsafe device has been shut down and seen their devices destroyed.

See also
 Electroencephalography
 Event-related potential
 Evoked potential
 Hemi-Sync
 Human enhancement

References

Literature
 Virtual Light & Sound Machine Psychologist simulates visual brainwave entrainment using flashes on computer monitor.
 https://www.erowid.org/experiences/subs/exp_Devices_Mind_Machine.shtml for subjective case reports about altered states of consciousness and other effects

Meditation
Self
Devices to alter consciousness